Toxic Thrash Metal is a 2004 compilation album by American thrash metal band Toxic Holocaust. It was originally released on cassette tape limited to 500 copies.

Track listing

Personnel
Joel Grind - vocals, guitar, bass, drums

References

2004 compilation albums
Toxic Holocaust albums
Thrash metal compilation albums